Otto Hintze (August 27, 1861 – April 25, 1940) was a German historian of public administration. He was Professor of Political, Constitutional, Administrative and Economic History at the University of Berlin. Influenced by Ernst Troeltsch and Max Weber, he emphasized the continuity and rationality of Western institutions.

Biography 

Hintze was born in the small town of Pyritz (Pyrzyce) in the Province of Pomerania, the son of a civil servant. From 1878 to 1879, Hintze studied history, philosophy and philology in Greifswald. Here he joined the fraternity Germania.

Hintze came to Berlin in 1880, and soon obtained a doctorate under Julius Weizsäcker with a dissertation on Medieval History in 1884. He joined the project on the ‘Acta Borussica’, an editing project of the Prussian Academy of Sciences under the directorship of Gustav Schmoller dealing with the Prussian administrative files of the 18th century. Seven volumes of sources on the economics and administrative organisation in Prussia, with detailed historical commentaries, were published by 1910. In 1895, his post-doctoral thesis to become a lecturer was accepted by Treitschke and Schmoller; in 1902 as Professor of the newly created Department of Political, Constitutional, Administrative and Economic History. In 1912, Hintze married his student Hedwig Guggenheimer. One of his key works, Die Hohenzollern und ihr Werk (The Hohenzollern and Their Legacy), is considered to be an important and solidly researched piece of scholarship, despite having been commissioned by the Prussian Hohenzollern dynasty for their ruling anniversary in 1915. Hintze was retired from the university in 1920 due to health reasons.

Hintze ceased publishing after the Nazi Party came to power and, in 1933, he was the only member to speak against Albert Einstein's expulsion from the Prussian Academy of Sciences. In 1938, Hintze himself resigned from the Academy, which he had been a member of since 1914. His wife, Hedwig Hintze (born: Hedwig Guggenheimer), who was Germany's first woman to receive a doctorate in History and the University of Berlin's (Friedrich Wilhelm University) first woman History professor, because of her Jewish roots and leftist sympathies soon lost her position as lecturer at the Friedrich Wilhelm University, and eventually had to flee to the Netherlands in 1939. Otto Hintze only survived this separation for a few months. In 1942, his wife committed suicide rather than undergo deportation to a death camp by the Nazis.

Legacy
Since the 1960s, there has been deeper research into Hintze's oeuvre, as signified by Gerhard Oestreich’s detailed new work on him. The historians Jürgen Kocka and Felix Gilbert agree that, in their opinion, he could possibly be the most significant German historian of the German Empire and of the Weimar Republic.

Hintze is considered an influential figure in the state formation literature, particularly among advocates for "bellicist" state formation theories. Bellicist theories hold that war and preparation for war played a key causal role in the development of the modern European state.

Works 
 Das Königtums Wilhelms von Holland, Leipzig 1885
 Die Preußische Seidenindustrie im 18. Jahrhundert und ihre Begründung durch Friedrich den Großen, 3 Volumes, Berlin 1892
 Einleitende Darstellung der Behördenorganisation und allgemeinen Verwaltung in Preußen beim Regierungsamt Friedrichs II., Berlin 1901
 Staatsverfassung und Heeresverfassung. Vortrag gehalten in der Gehe-Stiftung zu Dresden am 17. Februar 1906, Dresden 1906
 Historische und politische Aufsätze, 10 Volumes, Berlin 1908
 Monarchisches Prinzip und konstitutionelle Verfassung, in: Preußische Jahrbücher, Volume 144 (1911)
 Die englischen Weltherrschaftspläne und der gegenwärtige Krieg, Berlin 1914
 Die Hohenzollern und ihr Werk, Verlag: A. Steiger, Solingen 1915
 Deutschland und der Weltkrieg, 2 Volumes, Leipzig 1916
 Wesen und Verbreitung des Feudalismus, in: Sitzungsberichte der Preußischen Akademie der Wissenschaften (1929)

In English 
 The Historical Essays of Otto Hintze, ed. Felix Gilbert. Oxford University Press, 1975, .

References

Further reading
 Gerhard, Dietrich. "Otto Hintze: His Work and His Significance in Historiography" Central European History (1970), Vol. 3 Issue 1/2, pp 17–48.

External links 
 
 SEHEPUNKTE – Ausgabe 8 (2008), Nr. 6 - Rezension von: Preußen
 Hedwig Hintze (1884-1942)
 Biography of Otto Hintze at www.geschichte.hu-berlin.de

1861 births
1940 deaths
People from Pyrzyce
20th-century German historians
People from the Province of Pomerania
German male non-fiction writers
19th-century German historians